2022 Belarusian First League is the 32nd season of second tier football in Belarus. It started in April and ended in November 2022.

Team changes from 2021 season
Two best teams of 2021 Belarusian First League (Arsenal Dzerzhinsk and Belshina Bobruisk) were promoted to Belarusian Premier League. They were replaced by 15th-placed team of 2021 Belarusian Premier League (Smorgon). 16th-placed Premier League team Sputnik Rechitsa disbanded, leaving a vacancy in the First League.

Due to low number of participants, no team has relegated to the Second League. In attempt to bring the number of teams to 16, 5 best teams were initially promoted from the Second League (Ostrovets, Rogachev, Partizan Soligorsk, Osipovichi and BGU Minsk). After Partizan Soligorsk and BGU Minsk refused promotion due to insufficient financing, promotion was offered to Molodechno and Malorita. 

In the following months before the start of the season, Dnepr Mogilev was promoted to Premier League to replace Rukh Brest (who withdrew from the league due to international sanctions against its owners), Krumkachy Minsk were denied First League license and withdrew to the Second League for upcoming season, while Malorita stepped down from their initially accepted promotion and returned to the Second League due to financial reasons. Extra promotion spot was offered to Bumprom Gomel, but the team declined. Thus the number of participants was finalized at 13.

Teams summary

League table

Results

Top goalscorers

Updated to games played on 12 November 2022 Source: football.by

See also
2022 Belarusian Premier League
2021–22 Belarusian Cup
2022–23 Belarusian Cup

References

External links
 Official site 

Belarusian First League seasons
2
Belarus
Belarus